William Meral Halverson (May 4, 1919 – May 1, 1984) was an American football tackle for played in the National Football League (NFL) for the Philadelphia Eagles in 1942. After playing college football for Oregon State, he was drafted by the Eagles in the eighth round (63rd overall) of the 1942 NFL Draft. He served in World War II for the United States Army after the 1942 NFL season.

References

1919 births
1984 deaths
People from Davenport, Iowa
Players of American football from Iowa
American football tackles
Oregon State Beavers football players
Philadelphia Eagles players
United States Army personnel of World War II
Benson Polytechnic High School alumni
Players of American football from Portland, Oregon